The Italy women's national football team represents Italy in international women's association football and is controlled by the Italian Football Federation.

Italy participated at the 2020 Algarve Cup in Portugal: after beating the hosts 2–1 in the qualification round, Italy qualified to the semi-finals, where they beat New Zealand 3–0. Italy could not participate in the final for COVID-19 travel-related issues, and Germany won the competition by default. In the qualifiers for the UEFA Women's Euro 2022, which were played between 2019 and 2021, Italy were drawn with Denmark, Bosnia and Herzegovina, Malta, Israel, and Georgia. Italy finished in second place in their group, winning all games except a draw and a defeat to Denmark, and qualified to the final tournament.

Key

Key to matches
Att.=Match attendance
(H)=Home ground
(A)=Away ground
(N)=Neutral ground

Key to record by opponent
Pld=Games played
W=Games won
D=Games drawn
L=Games lost
GF=Goals for
GA=Goals against

Results

Italy's score is shown first in each case.

Notes

Record by opponent

References

Results
2020s in Italy
Women's national association football team results
Women's